Rigoletto or The King Amuses Himself (German: Der König amüsiert sich) is a 1918 Austrian silent historical film directed by Jacob Fleck, Luise Fleck and starring Wilhelm Klitsch, Hermann Benke and Liane Haid. It is based on the 1832 play by the French writer Victor Hugo. To recreate the look of Paris in the early sixteenth century, location shooting took place at the neo-gothic Vienna City Hall.

Cast
 Wilhelm Klitsch as Junger König 
 Hermann Benke as Rigoletto 
 Liane Haid as Blanche, Rigolettos Tochter 
 Karl Ehmann as marquis Saint Vallier 
 Eduard Sekler as Saltabadil, der Fischer
 Eugenie Bernay as Saint Valliers Tochter 
 Anka Sandro as Saltabadils Schwester

References

Bibliography
 Robert Von Dassanowsky. Austrian Cinema: A History. McFarland, 2005.

External links

Austro-Hungarian films
1918 films
Austrian silent feature films
Austrian historical films
Films directed by Jacob Fleck
Films directed by Luise Fleck
Austrian black-and-white films
1910s historical films
Austrian films based on plays
Films set in France
Films set in the 16th century